Marsippospermum gracile, common name - alpine rush, is a flowering plant species in the rush family Juncaceae which is native to New Zealand.

Description 

It is a densely tufted, rhizomatomous plant, whose rhizomes are about 5 mm in diameter and horizontal in plants on the South Island   ascending in plants from Auckland and Campbell Is. The stems are 8-40 cm by 0.5 mm., and  crowded on the rhizome with reddish brown bracts at their base, the upper conspicuously mucronate. The leaves can be roughly equal in length or much greater in length than the flowering stems. They are  slightly  less than 1 mm. wide, are terete, rigid, striated, bright green, and shining. The flowers are 1.5–3 cm. long, with an inconspicuous bract. There are six unequal tepals, which are pale brown with membraneous. margin. There are six stamens. The leathery capsules  are about half the length of tepals, and chestnut-brown. The seeds are about 2.5 mm. long, straw-coloured, and shining.

It flowers from December to February and fruits from January to March.

Taxonomy
It was first described in 1844 by Joseph Hooker as Rostkovia gracilis, but was assigned to the genus, Marsippospermum in 1879 by the German botanist, Franz Georg Philipp Buchenau, to become Marsippospermum gracile. The specific epithet, gracilis/gracile, comes from the Latin, gracilis,  meaning "slender, thin, graceful".

Conservation status
In both 2009 and 2012 it was deemed to be "Not Threatened" under the New Zealand Threat Classification System, and this  classification was reaffirmed in 2018.

References

External links
Marsippospermum gracile images and occurrence data from GBIF
Marsippospermum gracile occurrence data from AVH

gracile
Plants described in 1844
Taxa named by Franz Georg Philipp Buchenau